Lac des Salhiens is a lake located in Lozère, France, on the Aubrac plateau. It has a glacial origin like the other lakes located in this area (St Andéol, Souveyrols, Born). Its surface area is 0.06 km².

Salhiens